The Bichat–Claude Bernard Hospital is located in the 18th arrondissement of Paris, France, and is operated by Assistance Publique – Hôpitaux de Paris (APHP). It was founded in 1881 as l'Hôpital Bichat (after Xavier Bichat), incorporating the units of nearby Hôpital Claude-Bernard upon the latter's demolition in 1970. The Bichat–Claude Bernard Hospital is also a teaching hospital of the Université Paris Cité.

References

External links
Bichat–Claude Bernard Hospital (in French)

Hospitals established in 1881

1881 establishments in France
Hospitals in Paris
Teaching hospitals in France